Đinh Hoàng Max, also known as Maxwell Eyerakpo (born December 14, 1986 in Nigeria), is a Vietnamese–Nigerian footballer who plays as a midfielder for Bình Định

References

External links 

1986 births
Living people
Association football midfielders
Becamex Binh Duong FC players
V.League 1 players
Vietnamese people of Nigerian descent
Nigerian footballers
Vietnamese footballers
Vietnam international footballers
People from Abuja